Helmetshrikes are a family uniting some smallish to mid-sized songbird species. They were included with the true shrikes in the family Laniidae, later on split between several presumably closely related groups such as bushshrikes (Malaconotidae) and cuckooshrikes (Campephagidae), but are now considered sufficiently distinctive to be separated from that group into the family Vangidae.

Description and ecology
This is an African group of species which are found in scrub or open woodland. They are similar in feeding habits to shrikes, hunting insects and other small prey from a perch on a bush or tree.

Although similar in build to the shrikes, these tend to be colourful species with the distinctive crests or other head ornaments, such as wattles,  from which they get their name.

Helmetshrikes are noisy and sociable birds, some of which breed in loose colonies. They lay 2–4 eggs in neat, well-hidden nests.

Systematics
As the relationships of the shrike-like birds are increasingly disentangled, the helmetshrikes appear to form an evolutionary radiation with the Vangidae.

 Genus Prionops – typical helmetshrikes
 White-crested helmetshrike, Prionops plumatus
 Grey-crested helmetshrike, Prionops poliolophus
 Yellow-crested helmetshrike, Prionops alberti
 Red-billed helmetshrike, Prionops caniceps
 Rufous-bellied helmetshrike, Prionops rufiventris
 Retz's helmetshrike, Prionops retzii
 Gabela helmetshrike, Prionops gabela
 Chestnut-fronted helmetshrike, Prionops scopifrons

External links
Helmetshrike videos in the Macaulay Library

 
 
Taxa named by Louis Jean Pierre Vieillot